The 1996 Doc Martens European League was a  professional non-ranking snooker tournament that was played from 27 December 1995 to 12 May 1996. All matches including the play-offs were played at the Diamond Centre at Irthlingborough.

Ken Doherty won in the final 10–5 against Steve Davis. 


League phase

Top four qualified for the play-offs. If points were level then most frames won determined their positions. If two players had an identical record then the result in their match determined their positions. If that ended 4–4 then the player who got to four first was higher.

 27 December Match Day 1
 Peter Ebdon 8–0 Ken Doherty
 Steve Davis 5–3 Ronnie O'Sullivan
 28 December Match Day 2
 Ronnie O'Sullivan 6–2 Peter Ebdon
 Ken Doherty 5–3 Steve Davis
 Jimmy White 4–4 John Parrott
 13 January Match Day 3
 Ronnie O'Sullivan 5–3 Stephen Hendry
 Steve Davis 6–2 Jimmy White
 14 January Match Day 4
 John Parrott 4–4 Ronnie O'Sullivan
 Ken Doherty 4–4 Stephen Hendry
 Peter Ebdon 7–1 Jimmy White
 20 January Match Day 5
 Jimmy White 5–3 Ronnie O'Sullivan
 Stephen Hendry 4–4 John Parrott
 21 January Match Day 6
 John Parrott 5–3 Ken Doherty
 Peter Ebdon 5–3 Steve Davis
 Jimmy White 4–4 Stephen Hendry 13 April Match Day 7
 Ken Doherty 5–3 Ronnie O'Sullivan
 Steve Davis 4–4 John Parrott''
 Stephen Hendry 5–3 Peter Ebdon
 14 April Match Day 8
 Peter Ebdon 5–3 John Parrott
 Ken Doherty 5–3 Jimmy White
 Stephen Hendry 5–3 Steve Davis

Play-offs 
11–12 May (Diamond Centre, Irthlingborough, England)

References

Premier League Snooker
1996 in snooker
1996 in British sport